"I've Got Mine" was the second official song released by the English rock band Small Faces in 1965.  The song failed to chart despite receiving favourable reviews in the British music press.

"I've Got Mine" is a hard-hitting, moody R&B song and the first Small Faces single release written entirely by the songwriting duo of the band, Steve Marriott and Ronnie Lane, and features Marriott on main vocals. The song's release was planned to coincide with the release of 'pop/cop' crime film Dateline Diamonds about diamond smugglers. Small Faces appear in the film performing the song, however, the film was not shown in cinemas until long after the single was released into the UK singles chart and so the group lost out on the expected media exposure and publicity.
The song was revisited by the band in 1968, reworking it as an instrumental that served as the introductory title track from the album Ogden's Nut Gone Flake.

It was after the release of "I've Got Mine" that Jimmy Winston was released from the band and replaced by keyboardist Ian McLagan (formerly of The Muleskinners).  Winston co-wrote the B-side "It's Too Late" with Marriott and Lane.

Dateline Diamonds was mainly conceived by music publisher, Harold Shampan, as a publicity vehicle for up-and-coming talent. The plot revolves around smuggling diamonds between the Netherlands and the UK, via the ship, the MV Galaxy, concealed inside the band's demo tape boxes (unbeknownst to the Wonderful Radio London management). It featured the actors William Lucas, Kenneth Cope, George Mikell, Conrad Phillips, DJ Kenny Everett (as himself) and Patsy Rowlands. It was directed by Jeremy Summers.

Personnel
Small Faces
Steve Marriott – lead vocals, rhythm guitar
Ronnie Lane – bass guitar, backing vocals
Kenny Jones – drums
Jimmy Winston - lead guitar, backing vocals

See also
Small Faces discography

References/Notes
Notes:

References:

Paolo Hewitt John Hellier (2004). Steve Marriott - All Too Beautiful....  Helter Skelter Publishing .
Paolo Hewitt/Kenney Jones (1995) small faces the young mods' forgotten story – Acid Jazz

External links
 The Small Faces Official Website
 RADIOLONDON Sunday 3 April 1966 – Dateline Diamonds goes on general release.

Small Faces songs
1965 singles
Songs written by Ronnie Lane
Songs written by Steve Marriott
1965 songs
Decca Records singles
Song recordings produced by Ian Samwell